Zubato Sunce (Toothed Sunbeam) is the second and last studio album by the Serbian rock band Džukele, released by Metropolis Records in 1998. As backing vocalists on the album appeared Atheist Rap, Goblini, and Generacija Bez Budućnosti members.

Track listing 
All lyrics by Slobodan Vukosavljević "Bane" except for track 5, written by Nenad Drašković. All music written by Džukele.

Personnel 
 Leo fon Punkerstein (Artwork By [Design])
 "Draža" (Dragan Neorčić; bass)
 Prndža (Vladimir Šarčević; drums)
 Nenad Drašković (executive producer, lyrics by [track 5])
 Leo (Leonid Pilipović; guitar, vocals)
 Janez Križaj (mixed by, mastered by, producer)
 Željko Vukelić (photography)
 Jan Šaš (recorded by, producer)
 Bane (Slobodan Vukosavljević; lyrics by, vocals, guitar)
 Slobodan Misailović (cymbaline [track 8])

References 
 EX YU ROCK enciklopedija 1960-2006, Janjatović Petar; 
 Zubato Sunce at Discogs
 Zubato Sunce at Rateyourmusic

Džukele albums
1998 albums
Albums recorded in Slovenia